DSP is an 2022 Indian Tamil-language action comedy film written and directed by Ponram. The film stars Vijay Sethupathi and Anukreethy Vas while other actors like Prabhakar, Pugazh, Ilavarasu, G. Gnanasambandam, Deepa and Singampuli appear in other pivotal roles. The film was released theatrically on 2 December 2022 and was panned by critics, which resulted in the film becoming a box-office bomb.

Plot

Murugapandi is the "Wholesale Flower Business Association President" in Dindigul, whose family consists of his son Vascodagama, his daughter Sumathi and his wife. Murugapandi always wanted Vascodagama to get a government job and was very particular in it. In the name of trying for a government job, Vasodagama goes to Annapoorani's sweet shop to visit Annapoorani and enjoys his life with his friends happily. For a long time, the relatives have been visiting Vasodagama's house to check on the bride and Vasodagama and his sister Sumathi play bet on the incoming grooms. However, problems occur when a goon-cum-politician named Mutta Ravi arrives Vascodagama's life where he becomes the DSP due to unavoidable circumstances and finally finishes off Mutta Ravi.

Cast

Production
The film was tentatively titled as VJS46. On 10 November 2022, the title of the film was announced to be DSP along with the first look poster of the film being released. The shooting of the film was reportedly wrapped up on 15 February 2022. Actress Anukreethy Vas who was crowned the Femina Miss India 2018 was signed in to play the female lead. Initially she was to make her acting debut in Prashanth’s starrer Vettri, however due to the delay in the release of that film, this film marked her acting debut. On 30 November 2022, the makers unveiled the character posters of the film.

Music

Initially it was reported that Ghibran would be composing the music for the film. However he was replaced by D. Imman which marks his fourth collaboration with Ponram after Varuthapadatha Valibar Sangam, Rajinimurugan and Seemaraja and 5th collaboration with Vijay Sethupathi after Rummy, Rekka, Karuppan and Laabam. The audio rights of the film were purchased by Sun Network. The first single titled "Nalla Irumma" was released on 16 November 2022. The second single titled "Annapoorani" was released on 30 November 2022.

Release

Theatrical 
The film was released in theatres on 2 December 2022. The trailer of the film was released on 25 November 2022.

Home media 
The post-theatrical streaming rights of the film were bought by Netflix and Sun NXT, while the satellite rights of the film is sold to Sun TV. The film is scheduled for its digital premiere on Sun NXT from 30 December 2022.

Reception
DSP  received mixed to negative reviews from critics.

Logesh Balachandran of The Times of India gave the film 2 out of 5 and wrote "DSP falls short of a good mass entertainer but can satisfy the actor's fans." Avinash Ramachandran of Cinema Express gave the film 2.5 out of 5 stars and wrote "After a rather disappointing outing in his previous film, Ponram manages to get back on track with DSP."

Latha Srinivasan of India Today gave the film 2 out of 5 stars and wrote "On the whole, this movie is a complete miss. Vijay Sethupathi is an extremely talented actor but he needs to make more prudent choices when it comes to his films." A critic for India Herald wrote "One of the great aspects of the film was Prabakar's portrayal of Mutta ravi, a merciless rowdy-turned-politician, who looked frightening and convincing in the role." Kirubhakar Purushothaman of The Indian Express rated the film 1.5 out of 5 stars and wrote "The bigger problem with DSP is it doesn’t warrant the long runtime when Ponram is only repeating himself with some generic stuff like underwhelming songs and comedy sequences."

Tanmayi Sharma of Pinkvilla gave the film’s rating 2.5 out of 5 and wrote "On the whole, it is time for Tamil directors to come up with cop dramas that have a lot more to do than just the family revenge." Kalyani Pandian of ABP Live gave the film 2.5 out of 5 stars and wrote "Overall, people might have been saying that DSP has joined Vijay Sethupathi's flop list." Praveen Sudevan of The Hindu wrote "While the Portuguese voyager of the same name set sails for unexplored territories, with his Vasco da Gama, you head right into the land of cliches." Bharathy Singaravel of The News Minute gave the film 1 out of 5 stars and wrote "For ardent Vijay Sethupathi fans, this film will be an exhausting letdown."

Lakshmi Subramanian of The Week gave the film’s rating 2 out of 5 and wrote "Sethupathi is a crowd-puller who wins the audience with his casual mannerisms and quirky dialogues. In DSP too, Sethupathi does have all these, but fails to impress the audience because of a commonplace plot." Ashwin Ram of Moviecrow rated the film 2 out of 5 and wrote "A simple Police subject that holds a convincing backstory, has the potential to become a solid commercial flick, but settles on the ground level due to uninteresting situations and a screenplay with way too many deviations."

Notelist

References

External links
 

Indian action films
Films scored by D. Imman
2022 films
2020s Tamil-language films